Freja may refer to:

 Freja, a goddess in Norse paganism
 Freja (satellite), a Swedish satellite
 Freja Fjord, Greenland
 , a Diana-class large ocean patrol vessel of the Royal Danish Navy
 Randers Sportsklub Freja, a Danish sport club
Cheritra freja, a butterfly found in India

See also 
 Freia (disambiguation)
 Freya (disambiguation)
 Freyja (disambiguation)